The Scottish Falsetto Sock Puppet Theatre is a comedy act that began in the United Kingdom in 2005 and has performed nationally  and internationally since. They first appeared as part of The Sitcom Trials in London. They appeared in the Gilded Balloon at Edinburgh Festival Fringe in 2007, 2008, 2009, 2010, 2012, 2013, 2014, 2015, 2016, 2018, 2019 and 2022 attracting highly positive reviews. The act has toured nationally and internationally every year since 2008 including Australia, Holland, Denmark and the Channel Isles. Prestigious appearances have included the Cheltenham Literary Festival and the Edinburgh International Magic Festival. They have appeared on BBC TV's The One Show, Comedy Shuffle, The Culture Show, Points West and Upstaged, GMTV, MTV, Current TV and Channel 4's Big Brother's Little Brother.

They were winners of the Bath Comedy Festival Best Joke Award 2018. Their show was nominated Best Show at the Leicester Comedy Festival Awards in 2009, and was the Winner of the Edinburgh Festival Insider Comedy Award 2009.

They have appeared in DVD extras on the DVD releases of three classic Doctor Who serials: The War Games in 2009, The Horns of Nimon and The Dominators in 2010.

Their show is written and performed by comedian and comic book creator Kev F. Sutherland, author of Bash Street Kids Adventures and creator of The Sitcom Trials.

Adelaide Fringe 2012

References

External links
 
 Ham Life blog - A Socks fan's reviews and photos

British comedy troupes
Puppets
2005 establishments in Scotland